Weasel Walter (born Christopher Todd Walter, May 18, 1972) is an American composer, improviser, multi-instrumentalist, producer, and founder of ugEXPLODE Records. Walter's work has been informed by techniques and traditions of music including Avant-garde, experimental, no wave, free jazz, extreme metal, punk jazz, hardcore punk, noise, new music and 
free improvisation. He coined the term "brutal prog" to describe the aggressively dissonant strain of prog played by groups like his band The Flying Luttenbachers.

Known as an unrelenting and abrasive provocateur whose performances trend toward overblown antics and "nihilistic glee", Walter has been described by renowned guitarist Mary Halvorson as "completely manic and extraordinarily sensitive" and by The Chicago Reader as "a splinter lodged beneath the fingernail". Avant-garde artist Glenn Branca once called him "one of the greatest rock composers who ever lived".

He has performed as leader and sideperson in a number of bands, including Cellular Chaos and Lydia Lunch Retrovirus. Walter has worked with Marshall Allen, John Butcher, Tim Dahl, Peter Evans, Mary Halvorson, Henry Kaiser, Joe Morris, Jim O'Rourke, Evan Parker, Elliott Sharp, Ken Vandermark, and William Winant, as well as in bands including Sharon Cheslow, Bobby Conn, Cheer-Accident, Cock E.S.P., Curse of the Birthmark, Erase Errata, Harry Pussy, Lair of the Minotaur, Quintron, The Chicago Sound, The Scissor Girls, U.S. Maple, and XBXRX. He has produced albums by AIDS Wolf, Arab on Radar, Glenn Branca, Burmese, Lydia Lunch, Coachwhips, and Total Shutdown.

Career

In 1990, Walter moved to Chicago to work with free jazz composer Hal Russell (born Harold Luttenbacher) at Columbia College. The following year, Russell joined Walter in co-founding the band the Flying Luttenbachers; saxophonist Chad Organ played in the early trio lineup. Russell left the band in the summer of 1992, and shortly after Ken Vandermark took his place for the recording of the band's first 7".

Walter was highly involved in cultivating what he deemed the "Chicago No Wave" scene, meeting new musicians and collaborators through the Luttenbachers' art rock-continuum gigs and the experimental improvised music series he ran at Myopic Books. He graduated from Columbia College in 1995, with a final project, "Un-nerve", performed by a nonet including Ken Vandermark, Gene Coleman, Jim Baker, Kevin Drumm, Jeb Bishop, and Gustavo Leone.

A prolific performing and recording artist, Walter was a founding member of projects including Miss High Heel (with Jim O'Rourke and Azita of The Scissor Girls), Lake of Dracula (with Marlon Magas and Heather M. of the Scissor Girls), To Live and Shave in L.A. 2, 7000 Dying Rats, and Hatewave.

Walter moved to the San Francisco Bay Area in 2003, where he reformed The Flying Luttenbachers with the addition of bassist Mike Green, guitarist Ed Rodriguez, and later Mick Barr. The Flying Luttenbachers officially disbanded in 2007.

In late 2009, Walter announced that he was moving to New York City to join Behold... The Arctopus as the band's second drummer. He played on Horrorscension, released in 2012, and in two tours before leaving the band in 2013. Walter continued finding new collaborators and formed a number of groups in New York, among them Cellular Chaos, a band with Marc Edwards, Admiral Grey, and Ceci Moss.

In 2017, after a ten-year hiatus, the Flying Luttenbachers played several shows in France, with a new trio lineup of Walter, on drums, joined by bass guitarist Tim Dahl and guitarist Chris Welcome. In 2019, a quartet arrangement of the band released Shattered Dimension, with Walter and Dahl joined by saxophonist Matt Nelson and guitarist Brandon Seabrook. Over the next several years, the varying lineup also included bassist Evan Lipson, guitarist Henry Kaiser, guitarist Wendy Eisenberg, guitarist Katie Battistoni, guitarist Alex Ward, and drummer Sam Ospovat.

Discography

As solo artist 

Revolt Music (ugEXPLODE, 2006)
Early Recordings 1988–1991 (Savage Land, 2007)
Firestorm (ugEXPLODE, 2007)
Large Group Performances 2007-2009 (ugEXPLODE, 2009)
Apocalyptik Paranoia (Gaffer, 2009)
Invasion (ugEXPLODE, 2010)
Ominous Telepathic Mayhem (ugEXPLODE, 2011)
Improvised Music Sampler (2014)
End Of An Error (2014)
Fragments (2015)
Half-Death (2015)
Tribute To 'B' and 'C' List Musicians From The Early Years Of MTV, And G.G. Allin (2015)
For Andrew Ortmann (2015)
Seriously: Fuck The Entire World (2015)
Igneity: After The Fall Of Civilization (2016)
Curses (2016)
She's So 60 Minutes of Heavy (2016)
The Inevitable (Tombed Visions, 2016)
Expensive Taste (Kitty Play, 2016)
Skhiizm (ugEXPLODE, 2018)
The Best of the Worst (ugEXPLODE, 2020)

As band member 

with Behold... The Arctopus
Horrorscension (Black Market Activities, 2012)
with Burmese
Colony Collapse Disorder (Rock Is Hell, 2009)
Lun Yurn (ugEXPLODE/Rock is Hell, 2011)
with Cellular Chaos
Demo Live 5.12.11 (ugEXPLODE, 2011)
Cellular Chaos EP (ugEXPLODE, 2012)
Cellular Chaos (ugEXPLODE, 2013)
Diamond Teeth Clenched (Skin Graft, 2016)
Dirty Girl (ugEXPLODE, 2018)
with Encenathrakh
Respekt The Demo (Rectomorph/Dense(s)/Lindung, 2013)
Encenathrakh (P2/Dense(s), 2015)
The 2 Song Promo 19 (P2/Lindung, 2019)
Live Album (P2, 2020)
Thraakethraaeate Thraithraake (P2, 2020)
Studio Album (P2, 2021)
with The Flying Luttenbachers
Destructo Noise Explosion!: Live at WNUR 2-6-92 (ugEXPLODE, 1992)
Constructive Destruction (ugEXPLODE, 1994)
Destroy All Music (ugEXPLODE, 1995)
Revenge of the Flying Luttenbachers (Skin Graft, 1996)
Gods of Chaos (Skin Graft, 1998)
Retrospektiw III (ugEXPLODE, 1998)
"...The Truth Is a Fucking Lie..." (ugEXPLODE/Skin Graft, 1999)
Alptraum (ugEXPLODE, 2000)
Trauma (ugEXPLODE, 2001)
Infection and Decline (Troubleman Unlimited, 2002)
Retrospektiw IV (ugEXPLODE, 2002)
Systems Emerge from Complete Disorder (Troubleman/ugEXPLODE, 2003)
The Void (Troubleman/ugEXPLODE, 2004)
Spectral Warrior Mythos (ugEXPLODE, 2005)
Cataclysm (ugEXPLODE, 2006)
Incarceration by Abstraction (ugEXPLODE, 2007)
Destroy All Music Revisited (Skin Graft, 2007)
Shattered Dimension (ugEXPLODE, 2019)
Imminent Death (ugEXPLODE, 2019)
with Hatewave
Demo 1997 (1997)
Hatewave (Up Jumps The Devil/Tumult, 1998)
with Lake Of Dracula
Lake Of Dracula (Skin Graft, 1997)
Four Teachers / Violators 7" (Kill Rock Stars, 1998)
Skeletal Remains (Savage Land/Roccoco Records, 2006)
with Lydia Lunch
Retrovirus (ugEXPLODE, 2013)
3x3 EP (2015)
Urge To Kill (Rustblade/Widowspeak, 2015)
Live In Zurich (Widowspeak, 2016)
Brutal Measures (Widowspeak, 2016)
with XBXRX
 Sixth in Sixes (Polyvinyl, 2005)
 Wars (Polyvinyl, 2007)
 Sounds (Important Records, 2007)
 Un Usper (self-released, 2009)

Collaborations 

with Sheik Anorak & Mario Rechtern
The Forbidden Beat (Gaffer, 2010
Bass Bass Bass Bass (Gaffer, 2010)
with Josh Berman & Aram Shelton
Last Distractions (Singlespeed, 2009)
with Jeb Bishop & Alex Ward 
Flayed (ugEXPLODE, 2019)
with David Buddin
Quodlibet (2015)
with John Butcher & Damon Smith
Catastrophe of Minimalism (Balance Point Acoustics, 2017)
with Charity Chan, Peter Evans, & Tom Blancarte
Cryptocrystalline (ugEXPLODE, 2013)
with Nels Cline, Henry Kaiser, Jim Thomas, & Allen Whitman
Jazz Free (There Records/A Train, 2012)
with Kevin Drumm & Fred Lonberg-Holm
Eruption (Grob, 2004)
Marc Edwards / Weasel Walter Group
Mysteries Beneath The Planet (ugEXPLODE, 2009)
Blood Of The Earth (ugEXPLODE, 2010)
Solar Emission (ugEXPLODE, 2011)
with Martin Escalante 
Lacerate (ugEXPLODE, 2018)
with Peter Evans
Poisonous (ugEXPLODE, 2018)
with Peter Evans, James Fei, & Damon Smith
Eponymous (ugEXPLODE, 2008)
Peter Evans / Weasel Walter Group
Oculus Ex Abyssus (ugEXPLODE, 2008)
with Sandy Ewen
Idiomatic (ugEXPLODE, 2018)
with Sandy Ewen & Damon Smith
Sandy Ewen / Damon Smith / Weasel Walter (ugEXPLODE, 2012)
Live In Texas (Balance Point Acoustics, 2016)
Untitled ug 79 (ugEXPLODE, 2020)
with Den Svarta Fanan (Nonoko Yoshida, Ron Anderson, Joe Merolla, Walter)
Den Svarta Fanan (ugEXPLODE, 2013)
with Maria Faust & Tim Dahl
Farm Fresh (Gotta Let It Out, 2019)
with Paul Flaherty
Particles (2009)
with Paul Flaherty, C. Spencer Yeh, & Steve Swell
Dragonfly Breath (Not Two, 2013)
Dragonfly Breath III: Live At The Stone: Megaloprepus Caerulatus (Not Two, 2016)
with Michael Forbes & Andrew Scott Young 
American Free (ugEXPLODE, 2009)
 with Michael Foster, Steve Swell, & Brandon Lopez
Throes are the Only Trouble (2017)
with Gianni Gebbia & Damon Smith
Lichens (ugEXPLODE, 2007)
with Vinny Golia & Damon Smith 
Großes Messer (ugEXPLODE, 2009)
with Forbes Graham, Greg Kelley, & Paul Flaherty
End of the Trail (ugEXPLODE, 2008)
with Mary Halvorson
Opulence (ugEXPLODE, 2008)
with Mary Halvorson & Peter Evans
Mystery Meat (ugEXPLODE, 2009)
Electric Fruit (Thirsty Ear, 2011)
Mechanical Malfunction (Thirsty Ear, 2012)
with JeJaWeDa (Jeb Bishop, Jaap Blonk, Walter, & Damon Smith)
Pioneer Works vol. 1 (Balance Point Acoustics, 2019)
Pioneer Works vol. 2 (Balance Point Acoustics, 2019)
with Henry Kaiser & Charles K. Noyes
Ninja Star Danger Rock (There Records/ugEXPLODE, 2011)
with Henry Kaiser, Paul Plimley, & Lukas Ligeti
The Starbreak Splatterlight (There Records, 2012)
with Henry Kaiser & Damon Smith
Plane Crash (ugEXPLODE, 2009)
Plane Crash Two (New Atlantis, 2015)
with Henry Kaiser, Damon Smith, Vinny Golia, & Ra-Kalam Bob Moses
Astral Plane Crash (Balance Point Acoustics, 2018)
with Yoni Kretzmer & Pascal Niggenkemper
ProtestMusic (Outnow Recordings, 2014)
with Dominic Lash & Alex Ward
Trapeze (spoonhunt, 2015)
with Matteo Liberatore & Elliott Sharp
L'Ora Del Pasto (2020)
with Jacob Lindsay, Ava Mendoza, & Damon Smith 
Jus (Balance Point Acoustics, 2008)
with Fred Lonberg-Holm & Jim O'Rourke
Tribute to Masayuki Takayanagi (ugEXPLODE, 2000)
with Kenny Millions & Damon Smith
Fuck Music... Tell Jokes - You'll Make More Money (Unhinged, 2018)
with No Mor Musik (Nandor Nevai, Walter, Keshavan Maslak)
No Mor Musik (ugEXPLODE, 2010)
with Phonon (Elliott Sharp, Álvaro Domene, Colin Marston, Walter) 
Alloy (ZOaR, 2020)
with Chris Pitsiokos
Unplanned Obsolescence (ugEXPLODE, 2012)
Drawn and Quartered (One Hand, 2015)
with Chris Pitsiokos & Ron Anderson
Maximalism (Eleatic, 2013)
with Sam Weinberg & Henry Fraser 
Walter/Weinberg/Fraser / Maestro Day split (Renfusa, 2017)
Grist (ugEXPLODE, 2020)
with Sam Weinberg & Teté Leguia
Weinberg/Leguía/Walter (Buh Records, 2018)
with Sam Weinberg & Sandy Ewen 
Ventricles (Renfusa, 2020)
with Nate Wooley, Damon Smith, & Scott R. Looney
Scowl (ugEXPLODE, 2011)

References

1972 births
Living people
Musicians from Rockford, Illinois
Behold... The Arctopus members
The Flying Luttenbachers members
Thirsty Ear Recordings artists
Avant-garde jazz musicians
No wave musicians
American experimental musicians
21st-century American composers
21st-century American drummers
21st-century American bass guitarists
21st-century American guitarists
American experimental guitarists